Glös is the side-project of indie-rock musicians and siblings Keeley Davis and Maura Davis, along with friend Cornbread Compton. The group released its debut album on Lovitt Records in 2007.

Lineup
Keeley Davis: Guitar, Programming, Bass, Lead Vocals.

Cornbread Compton: Drums, Programming.

Maura Davis: Vocals.

Discography 
Harmonium (2007) Lovitt Records
Hidden Cities EP (2007)

External links
The Liberty Movement Zine - Interview with Keeley
MySpace profile
MusicIsMyDrug.com page
Cornbread Compton interview at Silent Uproar

American indie rock groups